Amerikabåt (plural Amerikabåten, lit. ) were the ships that carried emigrants from Scandinavian countries such as Norway and Sweden to the United States. Amerikabåten were technically simply a subtype of transatlantic ship but their role in the emigrant exodus gave them additional cultural significance.

References

Maritime history of Sweden
Passenger ships of Sweden
Swedish migration to North America
Maritime history of Norway
Passenger ships of Norway
Norwegian migration to North America
Maritime history of Denmark
Passenger ships of Denmark
Danish migration to North America
History of immigration to the United States